Shravandanahalli is a remote village in Madhugiri taluk, Tumkur district of Karnataka, India. This small village is geographically linked to the Chikkaballapur district through another village called Chandanadur. This village is famous for its historic intellectualism. Shravandanahalli has a century-old government primary school. Late Mudamalegowda and his family members have contributed about 100 acres of land to this primary school, which is being maintained by the Department of Forest, Government of Karnataka. This is the record in the history of Karnataka where a single family has donated 100 acres of land to a primary school. The high school is called Sri Mahadeshwara Rural High school. Sri T. V. Venkataswamy, Madhugiri is the founder of this institution. Most religious groups reside peacefully in this village. There is a famous temple of holy god Sri Mahadeshvara in this village.

References 

Villages in Tumkur district